Doli Saja Ke Rakhna is a 1998 Indian Hindi-language romance film directed by Priyadarshan, with Akshaye Khanna and Jyothika  in lead roles. The plot is adapted from the Malayalam film Aniyathipraavu. The music was composed by A. R. Rahman. This is Jyothika's debut film.

Plot
Inder moves to a new town to pursue his higher studies, in spite of the pressure from his parents to marry and settle down. There, he meets a beautiful, yet shy girl Pallavi. He instantly falls in love with her, even when her identity remains unknown. When an opportunity presents itself, his friends convince him to talk to her, while she tries to avoid the conversation. This is seen by her brother, who mistakes him for a stalker and so do her two other brothers; who thrash and leave him with a warning. Pallavi is the apple of the eye of her family. She lives with her mother and three elder brothers. They are overprotective of her and she does not do anything against their wish. Inder's family is not that different, except him being the only son. 

The thought Pallavi of now burdens Inder's mind, and he sets out to find out how she feels about him. He asks her to give him an answer, even if it is a no.

Pallavi on the other hand, is unable to make a decision — further aggravating the situation. When Pallavi's brother finds out that Inder is still after her, he turns furious and beats him up, warning him to back off . Pallavi, now realizing that she had always loved Inder, feels that her timidity worsened the situation. She confesses her feelings to Inder and they kindle their relationship. They believe that their families will agree to their relationship. Within days. Pallavi's brother sees them together, while Inder is chasing Pallavi playfully. He mistakes it to be an attempt to assault her and tries to brutally attack him. Pallavi with her newfound courage, openly declares her love for Inder. The news devastates her family, leading them to reject her as a part of their family. 

They search for Inder, forcing the desolate couple to elope. Pallavi's brothers search for Inder in his family home, verbally abusing his parents. 
Inder's parents are convinced that the girl is no good for their son, considering the behavior of her brothers.

With their beliefs broken and without a place to go to, one of their two close friends takes them couple home to his small village. They are welcomed by his father who is the leader of the village and the villagers. Her brothers trace them to the village that evening and are met with resistance from the villagers. They go home, and the villagers plan to get the couple legally married the next morning.

Pallavi and Inder, now seeing the situation that they put their families in, and the sorrow that they have brought upon themselves and their families; decide to back out from the relationship and return to their families. They realize that the best thing they can do to prove their love, is to go back to their families. Although initially insulted with their decision to separate, The village leader appreciates their choice once he understands their reason. Their families, on seeing them return, forgive them right away and accept them back.

Both the families now feel indebted to their children and recognize their pain they try so hard to hide. They search for better matches for them both - Pallavi's family arrange a marriage for her. Inder finds with him a necklace belonging to Pallavi. His parents decide to go along with him to return the necklace, partially due to Inder's mother's wish to meet Pallavi. Both the families apologize for the happenings earlier and Inder apologizes to Pallavi's mother. The situation being depressing, they decide to leave early, but Inder's mother breaks into tears and requests to get Pallavi married to her son. Everyone, having felt the same way, agree on their marriage and apologize to their children, for the pain that they put them through.

Cast
 Akshaye Khanna as Inderjit "Inder" Bansal 
 Jyothika as Pallavi Sinha 
 Anupam Kher as Mr. Bansal
 Amrish Puri as Baba
 Moushumi Chatterjee as Mrs. Chandrika Bansal
 Aruna Irani as Mrs. Sinha
 Paresh Rawal as Dr. Suraj Sinha 
 Tej Sapru as Inspector Sinha
 Mohnish Behl as Vikram "Vicky" Sinha 
 Innocent as Colonel Vincent

Reception
Anish Khanna of Planet Bollywood gave the film 8.5 out of 10. Faisal Shariff of Rediff wrote, "The film plays on traditional family values, and that isn't very convincing. And the way it was carried off could have been a trifle subtler, we thought". 

The film was commercially unsuccessful.

Awards and nominations

Soundtrack

The soundtrack for the film was composed by A. R. Rahman. The lyrics were written by Mehboob. Rahman reused most of the songs in the 1999 Tamil film Jodi. The producers of Jodi's 2007 Kannada remake Sajni, bought the rights of the songs and used them in the film. The video clip of the song "Kissa Hum Likhenge" was made in the Greek islands Mykonos and Melos.

References

External links
 

1990s Hindi-language films
Hindi remakes of Malayalam films
1998 films
Films directed by Priyadarshan
Films scored by A. R. Rahman
Films shot in Greece
Indian romantic drama films